Rue d'Alésia is a major street in the south of Paris, which runs along the entire east-west length of the 14th arrondissement.  It is one of the few streets in Paris named after a French defeat, or more precisely, a Gallic defeat: the Battle of Alesia.  Lined with acacia trees, the street extends to the east as Rue de Tolbiac into the 13th arrondissement, and to the west as Rue de Vouillé into the 15th arrondissement.  It intersects Avenue du Général Leclerc at the Place Victor et Hélène Basch (or simply Alésia), the location of the Église Saint Pierre de Montrouge, as well as of the Alésia Métro station.

Alesia, Rue de